Carpanthea, called vetkousie, is a genus of flowering plants in the iceplant family Aizoaceae, native to the southwest of the Cape Province of South Africa. Low-lying succulent annuals, their flowers and fruit are edible.

Species
Currently accepted species include:

Carpanthea calendulacea (Haw.) L.Bolus
Carpanthea pomeridiana (L.) N.E.Br.

References

Aizoaceae
Aizoaceae genera
Taxa named by N. E. Brown